South Africa competed in the 2014 Commonwealth Games in Glasgow, Scotland from 23 July – 3 August 2014. It is the sixth occasion that South Africa has been represented at the Commonwealth Games since re-joining the Commonwealth in 1994 after a break of 33 years during the international sports isolation period. The squad is spread over 15 codes, from aquatics to wrestling.

Medalists

* - Indicates the athlete competed in preliminaries but not the final

Athletics

Men
Track & road events

Field Events

Combined events – Decathlon

Women
Track & road events

Field Events

Badminton

Mixed team

Pool E

Boxing

Men

Cycling

Mountain biking

Road
Women

Track
Sprint

Pursuit

Time trial

Points race

Scratch race

Keirin

Field hockey

Men's tournament

Pool A

Fifth and sixth place

Women's tournament

Pool A

Semifinals

Bronze medal match

Gymnastics

Artistic
Men

Individual all around final

Women

Individual all around final

Individual finals

Rhythmic
Team

Individual

Individual finals

Judo

Men

Women

Lawn Bowls

Men

Women

Netball

Pool B

Rugby sevens

South Africa has qualified a rugby sevens team.

Quarter final

Semi final

Gold medal match

Shooting

Swimming

Men

Women

Qualifiers for the latter rounds (Q) of all events were decided on a time only basis, therefore positions shown are overall results versus competitors in all heats.
* – Indicates athlete swam in the preliminaries but not in the final race.

Triathlon

Mixed Team

Weightlifting

Men

Women

 Powerlifting

Wrestling

References

Nations at the 2014 Commonwealth Games
South Africa at the Commonwealth Games
2014 in South African sport